Bashirov is a Russian masculine surname, its feminine counterpart is Bashirova. It may refer to
Aleksandr Bashirov (born 1955), Russian film and theater actor and director
Aliasker Bashirov (born 1979), Turkmen boxer

See also
Bashkirov

Russian-language surnames